United Nations Security Council resolution 1418, adopted unanimously on 21 June 2002, after recalling all previous resolutions on the conflict in the former Yugoslavia, particularly Resolution 1357 (2001), the council, acting under Chapter VII of the United Nations Charter, extended the mandate of the United Nations Mission in Bosnia and Herzegovina (UNMIBH) and authorised the continuation of the Stabilisation Force until 30 June 2002.

It was one of several extensions of UNMIBH in this period, to allow more time for informal consultations concerning UNMIBH's mandate.

See also
 Bosnian War
 List of United Nations Security Council Resolutions 1401 to 1500 (2002–2003)
 Yugoslav Wars

References

External links
 
Text of the Resolution at undocs.org

 1418
2002 in Bosnia and Herzegovina
 1418
June 2002 events